Thulinia is a monotypic genus of flowering plants from the orchid family, Orchidaceae. The sole species is Thulinia albolutea, endemic to the Nguru Mountains of Tanzania.

See also 
 List of Orchidaceae genera

References 

Monotypic Orchidoideae genera
Orchideae
Orchideae genera
Orchids of Africa
Flora of Tanzania